The 1945 Detroit Lions season was their 16th in the league. The Lions improved on their previous season's output of 6–3–1, winning seven games. They failed to qualify for the playoffs for the 10th consecutive season. Fullback Bob Westfall led the team in rushing and scoring and was selected by the Associated Press to the 1945 All-Pro team.

Schedule

Note: Intra-division opponents are in bold text.

Standings

References

External links
1945 Detroit Lions at Pro Football Reference
1945 Detroit Lions at jt-sw.com

Detroit Lions seasons
Detroit Lions
Detroit Lions